Babelomurex lischkeanus, otherwise known as the Australian coral shell is a species of sea snail, a marine gastropod mollusc in the family Muricidae, the murex snails or rock snails.

Description
The sea snail is most commonly seen with a pure white shell, that is somewhat jagged. The shell is approximately 50mm in length at adult size.

Distribution
The seas snail is found along the Eastern coast of Australia, from Tasmania to the Southern parts of Queensland.

References

External links
 Oliverio M. (2008) Coralliophilinae (Neogastropoda: Muricidae) from the southwest Pacific. In: V. Héros, R.H. Cowie & P. Bouchet (eds), Tropical Deep-Sea Benthos 25. Mémoires du Muséum National d'Histoire Naturelle 196: 481–585, at page 537.
 Kilburn R.N., Marais J.P. & Marais A.P. (2010) Coralliophilinae. pp. 272–292, in: Marais A.P. & Seccombe A.D. (eds), Identification guide to the seashells of South Africa. Volume 1. Groenkloof: Centre for Molluscan Studies. 376 pp.

lischkeanus
Gastropods described in 1882